A sneaker is a type of shoe originally designed for athletics.

Sneaker or sneakers may also refer to:

Music 
 Sneaker (band), an American rock band
 Sneaker (album), album by Sneaker
 Sneakers (band), a Danish rock band
 "Sneakers" (song), a 2022 song by Itzy

Literature 
 Sneaker (comic), a character in the UK comic, The Dandy
 The Sneaker, a Japanese light novel magazine
 "Sneakers" (short story), a 1989 short story by Stephen King

Film 
 Sneakers (1992 film), an American film starring Robert Redford
 Sneakers (2011 film), a Bulgarian film

Other 
 Sneaker wave, type of ocean wave
 Sneakers (2002 video game), for the Xbox
 Sneakers (1981 video game), for the Apple II computer

See also
 Sneak (disambiguation)
 Sneakernet, jargon for computer file transfer
 Sneakernight, a song by Vanessa Hudgens